Michael Robert Neuman is an engineer at Michigan Technological University in Houghton, Michigan. He was named a Fellow of the Institute of Electrical and Electronics Engineers (IEEE) in 2013 for his work with biomedical sensors and instrumentation with clinical applications.

References

Fellow Members of the IEEE
Michigan Technological University faculty
American electrical engineers

Living people
Year of birth missing (living people)
Place of birth missing (living people)